6pc Hot EP is the first extended play by American singer 6lack. It was released on June 26, 2020, through LVRN and Interscope Records. Production was handled by twelve record producers, including DJ Battlecat, Nick Mira, Stwo, Timbaland, Canadian producer London Cyr, and British producer Fwdslxsh, the latter two of whom executive-produced the EP. It features a sole guest appearance from rapper Lil Baby on the single "Know My Rights".

Background
In May 2020, 6lack released the track "ATL Freestyle", initially as a free track. On June 24, 2020, he celebrated his birthday with the release of the single "Float". The same day, after holding back on releasing new music in honor of George Floyd, and in solidarity with protests against police brutality, he announced the release of 6pc Hot.

Critical reception

6pc Hot EP was met with generally favorable reviews from critics. At Metacritic, which assigns a weighted average rating out of 100 to reviews from mainstream publications, this release received an average score of 77, based on five reviews.

Track listing

Personnel

Ricardo Valdez Valentine Jr. – vocals
Dominique Jones – vocals (track 4)
ELHAE – additional vocals (track 1)
Courtney Shanade Salter – additional vocals (track 2)
Malik "Venna" Venner – saxophone (track 2)
Maschine – drums (track 4)
Adeyinka "Fwdslxsh" Bankole – producer (tracks: 1, 3, 4, 6)
Christopher "Gravez" Justice – producer (track 1)
Steven "Stwo" Vidal – producer (track 2)
Trevor "Singawd" Slade – producer (tracks: 3, 4, 6)
Jack Rochon – producer (track 3)
Nicholas Warren Mira – producer (track 3)
Joseph Reeves – guitar and producer (track 4)
James Cyr – producer (track 4)
Timothy Zachery Mosley – producer (track 5)
Kevin Gilliam – producer (track 5)
Brody Brown – producer (track 5)
Rance – producer (track 5)
Jared "JT" Gagarin – mixing and recording (tracks: 1–4, 6)
Matthew Robinson – recording (track 4)
Manny Marroquin – mixing (track 5)
Chris Galland – mixing (track 5)
Robin Florent – assistant mixing (track 5)
Scott Desmarais – assistant mixing (track 5)
Dylan Del-Olmo – recording (track 5)
Lorenzo Cardona – recording (track 5)
Elton "L10MixedIt" Chueng – mastering

Charts

References

2020 EPs
Albums produced by Timbaland
Albums produced by Battlecat (producer)